For the French publisher see Émile de Girardin.

Joseph-C. Émile Girardin,  (1895 – March 20, 1982) was a Canadian businessman and president of Mouvement Desjardins from 1959 to 1972.

In 1969, he was made a Companion of the Order of Canada, Canada's highest civilian honour, "for his service to savings institutions".

Further reading

References

1895 births
1982 deaths
Businesspeople from Quebec
Companions of the Order of Canada